A Winter Tan is a 1987 Canadian drama film. Based on the book Give Sorrow Words by Maryse Holder, the film stars Jackie Burroughs as Holder.

The screenplay was written by Burroughs and John Frizzell, and the film was directed and produced jointly by Burroughs, Frizzell, Louise Clark, John Walker and Aerlyn Weissman.

Plot summary
Jackie Burroughs stars as Maryse Holder, the ill-fated feminist author who met an untimely death in Acapulco. Her behavior  toward Mexican men was to regard them as subjects for the pursuit of sexual and romantic adventure. Her own pursuits of sex, booze and love lead to her death at the hands of one of her many macho partners.

Cast
 Jackie Burroughs  as Maryse Holder
 Erando Gonzalez  as Miguel Novaro
 Anita Olanick  as Pam
 Diane D'Aquila  as Edith

Awards
Burroughs won the Genie Award for Best Actress.

References

External links
 
 

1987 films
Canadian drama films
English-language Canadian films
1987 drama films
Films directed by John Walker
1980s English-language films
1980s Canadian films